The 1952 United States Senate election in Indiana took place on November 4, 1952. Incumbent Republican U.S. Senator William E. Jenner was for re-elected to a second term in office over Governor of Indiana Henry F. Schricker.

General election

Candidates
 Carl Leon Eddy (Progressive)
William E. Jenner, incumbent Senator since 1947 (Republican)
John Marion Morris (Socialist Labor)
Henry F. Schricker, Governor of Indiana (Democratic)
 Carl W. Thompson (Prohibition)

Results

See also 
 1952 United States Senate elections

References

Indiana
1952
1952 Indiana elections